Chennai Unified Metropolitan Transport Authority - (CUMTA) is a government agency in Chennai that participates in the local governance of  public transport concerns.

References

Metropolitan transport agencies of India
Transport in Chennai